USS Corvina (SS-226), a Gato-class submarine, was the only ship of the United States Navy to be named for the corvina.

Construction and commissioning
Corvina′s keel was laid down by the Electric Boat Company of Groton, Connecticut, on September 21, 1942. She was launched on May 9, 1943, sponsored by Mrs. LaRene P. Christie, wife of Rear Admiral Ralph. W. Christie, commander of submarine operations in Fremantle, Australia, and commissioned on August 6, 1943.

Service record

Clearing New London, Connecticut, on September 18, 1943, Corvina  arrived at Pearl Harbor on October 14. She put out from Pearl Harbor on her maiden war patrol November 4, topped up her fuel tanks at Johnston Island two days later, and was never heard from again.

Her assignment had been a dangerous one: to patrol as closely as possible to the heavily guarded stronghold of Truk and to intercept any Japanese sortie endangering the forthcoming American invasion of the Gilbert Islands. Japanese records report that Japanese submarine I-176 launched three torpedoes at an enemy submarine south of Truk on November 16, claiming two hits which resulted in the explosion of the target. Her loss with her crew of 82 was announced March 14, 1944, making Corvina the only American submarine to have been sunk by a Japanese submarine in the entire war.

In popular culture

The 1951 John Wayne film Operation Pacific makes reference to the loss of Corvina. In the film, the fictitious Gato-class submarine USS Thunderfish makes an impromptu rendezvous with Corvina after Corvina reported problems with her Number 4 diesel engine.  The submarimes exchange engine parts and the commanding officers also exchange films, Lieutenant Commander Duke E. Gifford (played by Wayne) offering George Washington Slept Here and Corvina′s captain offering "a submarine picture," later revealed to be the 1943 film Destination Tokyo.  Later, while the crew of Thunderfish is watching Destination Tokyo, Gifford tries to figure out the source of torpedo explosions reported by Thunderfish′s sonar operator.  The following day, Thunderfish comes across wreckage, and discovers the case containing George Washington Slept Here, revealing that Corvina had been sunk.  Thunderfish′s radar then reports a single contact, and the submarine submerges. Gifford discovers "one I-type Jap submarine" while looking through the periscope.  Thunderfish then engages, torpedoes, and sinks the Japanese submarine, avenging the loss of Corvina.

See also 
List of U.S. Navy losses in World War II

References

External links 
On Eternal Patrol: USS Corvina

Gato-class submarines
World War II submarines of the United States
Lost submarines of the United States
World War II shipwrecks in the Pacific Ocean
Ships built in Groton, Connecticut
Ships sunk by Japanese submarines
1943 ships
Ships lost with all hands
Maritime incidents in November 1943
Submarines sunk by submarines